A needlegun scaler, needle scaler or needle-gun is a tool used to remove rust, mill scale, and old paint from metal surfaces.  The tool is used in metalwork applications as diverse as home repair, automotive repair and shipboard preservation.

Operation and use
A needle gun has a set of very fine chisels known as needles.  The tool forces these needles against a work surface at variable speeds up to around 5,000 times per minute.  Different models offer choices of number of needles, operating speed, and power levels.  Many models use compressed air, although electrical needle-guns do exist.

In a pneumatic unit, compressed air forces a piston forwards and backwards.  This movement causes the needles to move back and forth against the work surface.

The needle gun has advantages over other scaling tools. Its main advantage is that the needles automatically adjust themselves to contours, making the tool a good choice for cleaning irregular surfaces. A needle gun can clean an area to bare metal in seconds, and compares well to other scaling tools in terms of accuracy and precision.

It is recommended that before needlegunning, a surface should be prepared by removing oil, grease, dirt, chemicals and water-soluble contaminants. This can be done with solvents or with a combination of detergent and fresh water.
Then, the needle gun is used to remove rust, loose scale, and paint, leaving bare metal. It is used most effectively by holding it at a 45° angle to the work surface. It is recommended that an area no larger than six to eight inches be cleared at once. Two to three passes over an area is generally sufficient to clean it. Then the process is repeated until the desired area is completed.

Prior to painting, it is desirable to feather any edges between metal and old paint. It is also important to check the surface for oil deposited during chipping, and if necessary, clean the area with solvents. Since bare metal surfaces will flash rust soon after exposure to the atmosphere, paint should be applied as soon as possible after  chipping.  If flash rusting occurs prior to coating, further chipping, cleaning and sanding may be necessary.

See also
 Abrasive blasting
 Corrosion
 Wire brush

References

General references 
 
 —CHAP 7 LINK NO LONGER WORKS

External links
Battleship Texas Restoration Manual
Standard Industrial Cleaning Process
Pharmaceutical Ultrasonic Cleaning
Safety While Removing Paint

Cleaning tools
Metalworking hand tools